Mardam-Bey is a surname of a prominent Syrian family of Ottoman Turkish ancestry. Mardam-Bey’s are also the descendants of Abd Al Rahman Ben Mouhamad Ben Moustafa Bey Al Kourmoshi whose ancestor is the famous minister Lala Moustafa Pasha, the Grand Vizier of the Ottoman Empire and the leader of the conquest of Cyprus Island. This family is considered one of the most honorable and glorious families in Damascus. The family members were known to be the elite of the society and didn't meddle in other people's lives. They were peaceful in contrast to other prominent families in Damascus.

People with the surname Mardam-Bey include:

 Jamil Mardam Bey (1894–1960), Syrian politician, Foreign Minister, Prime Minister
 Khaled Mardam-Bey (born 1968), British software developer and creator of mIRC
 Khalil Mardam Bey (1895–1959), Syrian poet who composed the Syrian national anthem's lyrics
 Salma Mardam Bey, Syrian writer and historian

References

Compound surnames
Arabic-language surnames
Syrian families
Mardam-Bey family
Political families of Syria